Kate en Boogie is a Philippine television situational comedy series broadcast by GMA Network. Starring Dennis Padilla and Nanette Medved, it premiered on July 19, 1993. The series concluded on November 24, 1994.

Plot
Kate is a rich girl who fall in love with a very poor guy named Boogie. They follow their hearts and got married. But married life is not as easy and fun as they thought it would be, specially on Boogie's part. He has to give Kate a comfortable life... but how? This is where the funny and romantic love story of Kate and Boogie starts.

Cast and characters
Lead cast
 Dennis Padilla as Boogie
 Nanette Medved as Kate

Supporting cast
 Caridad Sanchez
 Willie Revillame
 Charina Scott
 Raffy Rodriguez
 Ana Roces
 Johnny Wilson
 Smokey Manaloto

External links
 

1993 Philippine television series debuts
1994 Philippine television series endings
Filipino-language television shows
GMA Network original programming
Philippine comedy television series
Philippine television sitcoms
Television series by Viva Television